Gymnopilus armillatus is a species of mushroom-forming fungus in the family Hymenogastraceae.

Description

Habitat and distribution
Gymnopilus armillatus has been found growing on the root of a living sweetgum tree, in Florida in December.

See also

 List of Gymnopilus species

References

armillatus
Fungi of North America
Taxa named by William Alphonso Murrill